Switzerland Township is one of the eighteen townships of Monroe County, Ohio, United States. As of the 2010 census, the population was 462.

Geography
Located in the northeastern corner of the county along the Ohio River, it borders the following townships:
York Township, Belmont County - north
Salem Township - south
Adams Township - southwest
Sunsbury Township - west
Washington Township, Belmont County - northwest
Marshall County, West Virginia lies across the Ohio River to the east.

No municipalities are located in Switzerland Township.

Name and history
It is the only Switzerland Township statewide.

Government
The township is governed by a three-member board of trustees, who are elected in November of odd-numbered years to a four-year term beginning on the following January 1. Two are elected in the year after the presidential election and one is elected in the year before it. There is also an elected township fiscal officer, who serves a four-year term beginning on April 1 of the year after the election, which is held in November of the year before the presidential election. Vacancies in the fiscal officership or on the board of trustees are filled by the remaining trustees.

References

External links
County website

Townships in Monroe County, Ohio
Townships in Ohio